Dumka Sadar subdivision is the only administrative subdivision of the Dumka district in the Santhal Pargana division in the state of Jharkhand, India.

Overview
Dumka Sadar subdivision is a plateau region. It is divided into four micro subregions. The Dumka-Godda Uplands covers Saraiyahat, Jarmundi, Jama, Ranishwar, Shikaripara and parts of Ramgarh, Dumka and Masalia CD blocks. The Deoghar Uplands covers only parts of Masalia CD block. The area has large number of hillocks covered with forests. The Rajmahal Hills, spread over the north-eastern part of the subdivision, covers Ramgarh, Dumka, Kathikund and Gopikandar CD blocks. The two blocks, named last, also fall under the Damin-i-koh region of Santhal Parganas.

History
Dumka subdivision was formed in 1855 as a part of Santhal Parganas district with its headquarters at Dumka. Santhal Parganas district comprisef Dumka, Deoghar, Sahibganj, Godda, Pakur and Jamtara subdivisions. In 1983, Deoghar, Sahibganj and Godda subdivisions were given the status of a district, and a result Dumka subdivision remained in Dumka district.

Subdivisions
Dumka district has only one administrative subdivision:

Administrative units

Dumka subdivision has 10 community development blocks, 2,925 total villages, 2,688 inhabited villages, 2 statutory towns and 3 census town. The statutory towns are at Dumka and Basukinath. The census towns are: Rasikpur, Dudhani and Purana Dumka. The subdivision has its headquarters at Dumka.

Demographics
As per the 2011 Census of India data Dumka Sadar subdivision, in Dumka district in 2011, had a total population of 1,321,442. There were 668,514 (51%) males and 652,928 (49%) females. Scheduled castes numbered 79,614 (6.02%) and scheduled tribes numbered 571,077 (43.22%). Density of population was 351 persons per square km. Literacy rate was 61.02%, male literacy rate was 72.96%, female literacy rate was 48.82%.

See also – List of Jharkhand districts ranked by literacy rate

Police stations
Police stations in Dumka Sadar subdivision are at:
Gopikandar
Hansdiha
Jama
Jarmundi
Kathikund
Masalia
Mufassil
Ramgarh
Ranishwar
Shikaripara
Saraiyahat
Taljhari
Tongra
Town

Blocks
Community development blocks in Jamtara Sadar subdivision are:

Education
In 2011, Dumka Sadar subdivision out of a total 2,688 inhabited villages there were  377 villages with pre-primary schools, 2,118 villages with primary schools, 701 villages with middle schools, 77 villages with secondary schools, 25 villages with senior secondary schools, 5 villages with general degree colleges, 542 villages with no educational facility.
.*Senior secondary schools are also known as Inter colleges in Jharkhand

Educational institutions
The following institutions are located in Dumka Sadar subdivision:
Sido Kanhu Murmu University was established in 1992 at Dumka.
Government Engineering College Dumka was established as an institution under PPP model between the Government of Jharkhand and Techno India Group at Dumka.
Phulo Jhano Murmu Medical College and Hospital was established in 2019 at Dumka.
St. Xavier's College, Dumka  was established in 2011 at Maharo, Dumka.
Santal Pargana College was established in 1955 at Dumka.
Santal Pargana Mahila College was established in 1974 at Dumka.
A.N. College was established at Dumka.
Shikaripara College was established at Shikaripara.
Mayurakshi Gramin College was established at Ranishwar.
Phulo-Jhano Murmu College of Dairy Technology at Hansdiha, is Jharkhand's first Dairy Technology college established in 2019.

Healthcare
In 2011, Dumka Sadar subdivision there were 70 villages with primary health centres, 228 villages with primary health subcentres, 95 villages with maternity and child welfare centres, 37 villages with allopathic hospitals, 45 villages with dispensaries, 16 villages with veterinary hospitals, 31 villages with family welfare centres, 75 villages with medicine shops.
.*Private medical practitioners, alternative medicine etc. not included

Medical facilities
(Anybody having referenced information about location of government/ private medical facilities may please add it here)

References

Sub-divisions in Jharkhand